In mathematics, the elliptic gamma function is a generalization of the q-gamma function, which is itself the q-analog of the ordinary gamma function. It is given by

It obeys several identities:

and

where θ is the q-theta function.

When , it essentially reduces to the infinite q-Pochhammer symbol:

Multiplication Formula
Define

References
  

Gamma and related functions
Q-analogs